"The Lateness of the Hour" is episode 44 of the American television anthology series The Twilight Zone. It originally aired on December 2, 1960 on CBS. It was one of the six episodes of the second season which was shot on videotape in a short-lived experiment aimed to cut costs.

Opening narration

Plot
Jana, the sensitive daughter of a creative genius, Dr. William Loren, is distraught over her parents' reliance on her father's five seemingly perfect servants. After Jana pushes one of the maids down the stairs, the maid then gets up without injury, being a robot built by Dr. Loren, complete with programmed memories and personalities. Jana feels trapped, and wishes to go out; her father believes he is protecting her from the outside world, keeping the windows permanently shut.

She implores her father to dismantle the robots before he and her mother become completely dependent on them. Dr. Loren feels that doing so would destroy his work, which he believes is a form of life. He eventually gives in to save his relationship with his daughter, and orders the robots to his basement workshop, where they are to wait to be disassembled. The machines protest, asking how their service was substandard; Dr. Loren again orders them downstairs.

Once the robots are gone, Jana is thrilled and begins looking forward to a new life with traveling, socializing, romance, and children. Her parents react strangely to these happy tidings, and this, combined with realizing that the family photo album contains no pictures of her as a child, prompts Jana to arrive at the shocking awareness that she is a robot. Like the servants, all of her past memories were created by Dr. Loren.

Dr. Loren tries to explain that he and his wife were childless and wanted someone to love, and that they see her as their daughter. Jana is convinced that she was built not to be a beloved daughter, but to be merely a prop. She exclaims "I'm a machine" and repeatedly bangs her arm against a railing while yelling "No pain!" She becomes conscious of the fact that she cannot even feel love. This discovery causes Jana such anguish that her "father" recognizes it is not possible for her to go on this way. At some point later, the Lorens are seen relaxing as before, but it is revealed that Dr. Loren has erased Jana's identity and memory and now utilizes her as a replacement for the maid known as Nelda, who gave Mrs. Loren daily shoulder massages.

Closing narration

Credits
Directed by Jack Smight
Written by Rod Serling
Produced by Buck Houghton
Inger Stevens as Jana
John Hoyt as Dr. Loren
Irene Tedrow as Mrs. Loren
Tom Palmer as Robert
Mary Gregory as Nelda
Valley Keene as Suzanne
Doris Karnes as Gretchen
Jason Johnson as Jensen

Production
"The Lateness of the Hour" was one of six Twilight Zone episodes shot on videotape instead of film in an attempt to cut costs. By November 1960 The Twilight Zone'''s season two had already broadcast five episodes and finished filming sixteen. However, at a cost of about $65,000 per episode, the show was exceeding its budget. As a result, six consecutive episodes (production code #173-3662 through #173-3667) were videotaped at CBS Television City and eventually transferred to 16-millimeter film ["kinescoped"] for syndicated rebroadcasts. Total savings on editing and cinematography amounted to only about $30,000 for all six entries, not enough to justify the loss of depth of visual perspective, which made the shows look like stage-bound live TV dramas (such as Playhouse 90, which was also produced at CBS), or even daytime soap operas, which, at the time, were quickly and cheaply produced live on one or two sets. The experiment was deemed a failure and never attempted again.

See also
 List of The Twilight Zone (1959 TV series) episodes

References

Sources
DeVoe, Bill. (2008). Trivia from The Twilight Zone. Albany, GA: Bear Manor Media. 
Grams, Martin. (2008). The Twilight Zone: Unlocking the Door to a Television Classic''. Churchville, MD: OTR Publishing.

External links

The Twilight Zone (1959 TV series season 2) episodes
Fiction about memory erasure and alteration
Television episodes about robots
1960 American television episodes
Television episodes written by Rod Serling